The Sheridan Trust and Savings Bank Building, currently known as the Bridgeview Bank Building, is a 12-story terra cotta building at 4753 North Broadway Avenue in Uptown, Chicago. The first eight floors of the structure were built in 1924 by Marshall and Fox. Huszagh and Hill added a four-story addition in 1928. The City of Chicago granted the structure Chicago Landmark status on October 8, 2008.

The building's original tenant, the Sheridan Trust and Savings Bank, failed in 1931. Uptown National Bank began using the building in 1937. The bank and the building were acquired by Bridgeview Bank in 2003. In 2018, Bridgeview Bank was acquired by First Midwest Bank in a merger, but the building retained its name.

The building is home to a number of non-profit organizations and social service agencies, which have served low-income, immigrant, and refugee communities in the Uptown area. In 2019, the building was bought by the real estate developer Cedar Street, with plans to convert most of the building into residential units.

In popular culture

In an episode of the television series M*A*S*H in March 1977 ("Post-Op", season 5, episode 24), a patient from Chicago tells Col. Sherman T. Potter that this bank exists at the southeast corner of Broadway and Lawrence after Potter mistakenly believes a tavern stood on the site.

The interior of the building was used in the 2009 film Public Enemies.

References

Commercial buildings completed in 1924
Chicago Landmarks
Office buildings in Chicago